Gwenyth Valmai Meredith OBE (18 November 1907 – 3 October 2006), also known by her married name Gwen Harrison, was an Australian writer, dramatist and playwright, and radio writer. She is best known for her radio serials The Lawsons (1944–1949) and the longer-running Blue Hills (1949–1976).

Life
Meredith was born in Orange, New South Wales to George and Florence Meredith, and was their only child. She was educated in Sydney, first at Sydney Girls High School then the University of Sydney from which she graduated with a Bachelor of Arts in 1929. Her father believed that, with the Great Depression, there were too many people needing jobs and that she should stay at home. She therefore managed the housekeeping and from 1932 to 1939, owned and operated a bookshop.

Meredith married Sydney engineer, Ainsworth Harrison, on 24 December 1938. He proved to be "a devoted and supportive husband" and travelled around Australia with her as she researched her serials. They also travelled overseas several times. In an interview, she told Arrow that, with the support of her father and then her husband, she never had to make a living from her writing, though believed she could have if she had needed to.

She lived in Castlecrag for most of her working life  in a house known as "the Gingerbread House" which is located at 369 Edinburgh Rd.

She retired in 1976 when the last episode of her most famous serial, Blue Hills, went to air, and she and her husband moved from their beachside home "Braybrook", in Seaforth, to the Southern Highlands of New South Wales, where she did watercolour painting. Her other interests were gardening, bushwalking and flyfishing. She died at her home at Bowral on 3 October 2006, aged 98.

Career
From 1932 to 1939, with her father's financial backing, she was the owner of the Chelsea Book Club, which she soon expanded to include a drama club "Chelsea Theatre Group" that performed her earliest plays, including her "witty and sophisticated Wives Have Their Uses" at St James' Hall, Sydney. Other plays were Murders Are Messy, Ask No Questions and Shout at the Thunder (these last two performed at the Independent Theatre). 
From 1939 to 1943, she worked as a freelance writer, before commencing a 33-year career with the Australian Broadcasting Commission for which she wrote radio plays, serials and documentaries.

According to Arrow, Meredith entered a play competition in 1940 but was not selected as a winner by the judges. She did, however, win the listeners' poll. Following this she wrote over 200 episodes of a serial Fred and Maggie and 50 episodes of Night Porter. She was then chosen to create the ABC's new radio serial in 1944, The Lawsons, as a propaganda medium to introduce modern agricultural methods to Australian farmers. It proved a highly successful drama that ran for 1,299 episodes from 1 February 1944 to 5 February 1949. It chronicled a family living on a rural property, and their battle to survive and to cope with sons being away at war. When the final episode was announced, The Sydney Morning Herald remarked that "to many people throughout the Commonwealth this will be almost a national day of mourning. The complicated affairs of the Lawson family, their friends and their enemies have made the serial the most popular in the history of Australian radio". A stage version of The Lawsons premiered in the Masonic Hall, Bathurst, New South Wales, on 28 January 1950. None of the radio cast appeared in the stage version, but it did include a young Ed Devereaux.

The Lawsons serial was replaced by the even more popular and longest running radio serial production Blue Hills, which comprised 5,795 episodes, all written by Meredith, and which ran for over 27 years, from 1949 to 1976. Her method of writing Blue Hills was unusual. Though she originally typed her own scripts, she soon progressed to a Dictaphone, later a small tape recorder, and this was transcribed by ABC typists for the actors to read. Blue Hills made her a household name in Australia.

There were several novels based on the serials, and a comic strip version of The Lawsons, which appeared in The ABC Weekly during the mid to late 1940s.

Besides these two long-running serials and Ask Ginger, a children's serial which ran for a few months 1949–50, Meredith was also a noted playwright; three of her plays (Ask No Questions (1940), Shout at the Thunder (1942) and These Positions Vacant (1945)) were performed by the Independent Theatre, Sydney.

Awards
1967: Appointed a Member (MBE) of the Order of the British Empire for her services to radio entertainment
1977: Elevated to Officer (OBE) of the order for her services to the arts.

Bibliography
 81 pp.
 33 pp.
 248 pp.
 233 pp.
 244 pp.
 252 pp.
 249 pp.

Notes

References and external links

1907 births
2006 deaths
People from New South Wales
Australian Officers of the Order of the British Empire
Australian women dramatists and playwrights
20th-century Australian dramatists and playwrights
20th-century Australian women writers
Women radio writers
People educated at Sydney Girls High School
University of Sydney alumni